Vijay Rural Engineering College, also known as VREC, is a private engineering and polytechnic college established in 1997 in Nizamabad, Telangana, India.

History
VREC was established in 1997 with four branches of Computer Science Engineering, Electronics and Communication Engineering,
Electronics and Instrumentation Engineering and Mechanical Engineering with a capacity of 40 seats per branch. The Department of Civil Engineering was established in the year 2012. It is managed by Ideal Education Society.

Campus

The campus is divided into diploma (polytechnic) and undergraduate provision by A and B blocks respectively. Vijay College of Pharmacy is also situated in the VREC campus. The college started as Jawahar Knowledge Center in 2006 and it is upgraded to JKC-Star Center. It is co-ordinated by Institute of Electronic Governance. There are labs, workshops and computer centers within all the blocks of the college. There is a library and Information center in the A block.

Academics
The college admits undergraduate and diploma students every year through the statewide TS EAMCET and Polycet exams. It offers B.Tech in multiple disciplines. The college used to offer M.Tech, Master of Business Administration (MBA) & MCA till 2015 (year clarification needed) but the admissions into all PG courses were revoked by JNTUH and AICTE.

Departments
 Civil Engineering
 Mechanical Engineering
 Electronics and Communication Engineering
 Electrical and Electronics Engineering
 Computer Science Engineering

Intake
Undergraduate and Diploma 

Postgraduate  (admissions into all PG courses revoked by JNTUH)

Extra-curricular activities

Fests
The college holds cultural fests every year and it is also open to the students belonging to other engineering colleges in Nizamabad district.

NSS

NSS unit was established in the college in 2001. From the day of beginning, NSS unit was conducting various programmes. The main activities of NSS unit at VREC are blood donation camp, anti-ragging squads, medical camps in villages, environmental awareness and other LEAD programmes.

National Cadet Corps
The National Cadet Corps unit was inaugurated on 16 November 2013 by the commanding officer of NCC 12 (A) battalion, Col. Y S Pathania at Vijay Rural Engineering College. VREC is only college in the district that has set up separate National Cadet Corps units for boys and girls.

Placement cell
The training and placement cell was started with a vision to provide training to the students and to coordinate various training activities like soft skills, communication skills, aptitude and technical skills and certification programs like Infosys campus connect foundation program, DB2, Microsoft certification. It also provides career guidance to crack GRE, TOEFL, IELTS, GATE, GMAT and CAT.

Vijay group of institutions
 Vijay Rural Engineering College (VREC), Manikbhandar, Nizamabad, established in 1997
 Vijay Institute of Technology and Sciences (VITS, VJAY), Kamareddy, established in 2004 (closed)
 Vijay College of Education for Women, Mubarak Nagar, Nizamabad established in 2007
 Vijay College of Engineering For Women (VCEW), Mubaraknagar, Nizamabad, established in 2009 (closed)
 Vijay College Of Pharmacy (VCPN), Manikbhandar, Nizamabad, established in 2010
 Srinivas Reddy Institute of Technology (SNRJ), Armoor, Nizamabad, established in 2001 (closed)
 Vijay High School, Mubarak Nagar, Nizamabad, established in 1981.

See also
Kakatiya Institutions 
List of cities in Telangana by population
Nizamabad Railway Station
Nizamabad Bus Station

Notes
 Satya Phanindra Saibewar, a final year student of B.Tech at VREC, who represented the entire Telangana state was awarded the 'Best Leader Award' at the Yuva Summit-2015 held recently at Deshpande Foundation in Hubli of Karnataka. He received the award from the hands of Nobel laureate Kailash Satyarthi, Infosis Narayana Moorthy.

Gallery

References

Engineering colleges in Telangana
Education in Nizamabad, Telangana
Educational institutions established in 1997
1997 establishments in Andhra Pradesh